Trash House (sometimes listed as TrashHouse) is a comedy-horror feature film, shot in Essex in 2004 and released on DVD in Europe in February 2006. It was distributed by Screen Entertainment, the UK distributors of such controversial features as I Spit On Your Grave and Faces of Death. Directed by former stand-up comedian Pat Higgins, it was the first feature to be produced by Jinx Media Ltd and features cameos by several UK comedians, including Gary Delaney, Danny James and Nic Ford

References

External links 

Fangoria coverage of TrashHouse
HorrorTalk review of TrashHouse
"Comedy with Guts" Chortle article

2000s comedy horror films
2005 direct-to-video films
2005 films
British zombie comedy films
2000s British films